The Tsuutʼina Nation (also Tsu Tʼina, Tsuu Tʼina, Tsúùtínà – "a great number of people"; formerly Sarcee, Sarsi) is a First Nation band government in Alberta, Canada. Their territory today is confined to the  Tsuu T'ina Nation 145 reserve, whose east side is adjacent to the southwest city limits of Calgary. Their traditional territory spans a much larger area in southern Alberta. The land area of the current reserve is 283.14 km2 (109.32 sq mi), and it had a population of 1,982 in the 2001 Canadian census. The northeast portion of the reserve was used as part of CFB Calgary, a Canadian Army base, from 1910 to 1998. In 2006, the land was returned to the Nation by the Government of Canada. The Tsuutʼina people were formerly called the Sarsi or Sarcee, words which are believed to have been derived from a Blackfoot word meaning "stubborn ones". The two peoples long had conflict over the territory because the Sarcee are on traditional Blackfoot land. Because of its origins from an enemy, the term is now viewed as offensive by most of the Tsuutʼina.

History

The Tsuutʼina are an Athapaskan group, once part of the more northerly Dane-zaa ('Beaver Indians') nation, who migrated south onto the Great Plains during the 1700s, prior to any written records of the area. Tsuutʼina oral history has preserved the memory of their separation from the Dane-zaa.

Explorer David Thompson said that the Tsuutʼina lived in the Beaver Hills near present-day Edmonton during the 1810s, where they cohabited with the Cree. At some point, however, they came into conflict with the Cree and moved further to the south, eventually forming an alliance with the Blackfoot.

The Tsuutʼina likely acquired most of their Plains Indian culture from the Blackfoot. Although in most respects the Tsuutʼina are typical Northern Plains Indians, their Tsuutʼina language is an Athabaskan language, closely related to the languages of the Dene groups of northern Canada and Alaska, and also to those of the Navajo and Apache peoples of the American Southwest, rather than the geographically nearer Blackfoot language and the Cree language, which are Algonquian languages.

21st century 
In 2007, the Tsuutʼina opened the Grey Eagle Casino just outside Calgary city limits. The Grey Eagle complex began a major expansion, including construction of a hotel, in 2012. Both the initial construction of the casino and the expansion have been accompanied by concerns among city residents about traffic tie-ups in the area of the casino.

Beginning in the late 2000s, the proximity of the Nation's territory to the city of Calgary led to disagreement over Alberta's plans to construct the southwest portion of Highway 201, a ring road. The planned freeway, expected to be completed by 2024, will nearly encircle the City of Calgary. The southwest portion was planned to pass through Tsuutʼina land to avoid environmentally sensitive areas. A 2009 referendum by the Nation rejected a plan to transfer reserve land to the Province of Alberta to permit construction of the southwest portion of the ring road. Some members of the Nation were upset by the rejection of the land transfer, while others viewed it as a triumph both environmentally and for the Nation. A subsequent referendum held by the Nation in 2013 approved the land transfer for the ring road, the Tsuu Tʼina portion of which was named Tsuutʼina Trail, even though it caused the forced removal of some residents from their traditional land by the Chief and Council. The construction disturbed 22 hectares of wetlands.

On 28 August 2020, Costco opened a store at 12905 Buffalo Run Blvd, in the Shops at Buffalo Run development created by the Nation's development project, Taza. This store is the first Costco branch located on a First Nations reserve in Canada, and as of 6 October, Costco had indicated that the store had broken records.

Notable members
Harold Crowchild, last surviving Tsuutʼina and Treaty 7 veteran of World War II.
O. E. L. "Bud" Graves, artist and painter/sculptor, became a full member of the tribe after many years of association with its people.

Honorary chiefs
W. G. Hardy, professor at the University of Alberta given the honorary title of "Chief Running Eagle" by the Tsuutʼina.

See also 
 Tsuutʼina language

References

External links 

The Tsuutʼina Nation
Sarcee (Tsúùtínà): Article in the Canadian Encyclopedia Online
Community Profile: Tsuu T'ina Nation 145 (Sarcee 145) Indian Reserve, Alberta; Statistics Canada

Calgary Region
Plains tribes
Tsuut'ina